The Tunisian Union of Agriculture and Fisheries (Arabic: الاتحاد التونسي للفلاحة والصيد البحري; French: Union Tunisienne de l’Agriculture et de la Peche, or UTAP) is a Tunisian national trade union organization for farmers and fishermen. The current president is Abdelmajid Ezzar.

See also 

 UGTT
 UTICA

References 

Trade unions in Tunisia
Agriculture and forestry trade unions